"There You Are" is the debut single by the Goo Goo Dolls. It was the trio's first single and first music video released.

It was the first and only single from their third album Hold Me Up. The cassette version of the promo includes "On Your Side". "Sad Letters" and "Funhouse" by the band Junk Monkeys was included on the flip side.

Music video
The music video for "There You Are" features the band members playing at Pilot Field in their hometown of Buffalo, New York. It was originally supposed to be filmed in Milkie's on Elmwood on Elmwood Avenue (then known as The Elmwood Lounge), but the equipment wouldn't fit.

Track listing

"There You Are" - 3:07

Cassette Promo Track Listing (Not in particular order)
"There You Are" - 3:07
"On Your Side" - 3:05
"Sad Letters" by "Junk monkeys" - 3:05
"Funhouse" by "Junk monkeys"- ?:??

Personnel
Johnny Rzeznik–guitar, lead vocals
Robby Takac–bass guitar
George Tutuska–drums

Charts

References

1991 debut singles
Goo Goo Dolls songs
Music videos directed by John Lloyd Miller
1990 songs
Songs written by John Rzeznik
Songs written by Robby Takac
Songs written by George Tutuska